was a small post station in Japan's Edo period and part of the Aizu Nishi Kaidō. It is now located in the town of Shimogō in Minamiaizu District, Fukushima Prefecture, and is famous for the numerous traditional thatched buildings from the Edo Period that line its main street.

History
Ōuchi-juku was an important post town whose buildings served as shops, inns and restaurants for travellers. Many buildings have been preserved as they were before the Meiji Restoration, and the area has been designated as an Important Preservation District for Groups of Traditional Buildings. The village is now a popular tourist attraction.

See also
Aizu Nishi Kaidō
Simogo,Fukushima
Groups of Traditional Buildings
To-no-hetsuri

Gallery

References

External links
Ouchi-juku(Travel association)

Tourist attractions in Fukushima Prefecture
Buildings and structures in Fukushima Prefecture
Post stations in Japan
History of Fukushima Prefecture